Joysticks is a 1983 American comedy film directed by Greydon Clark.

Plot
Jefferson Bailey (Scott McGinnis) runs the most popular video arcade in town, much to the chagrin of local businessman Joseph Rutter (Joe Don Baker).  With his two bumbling nephews, Rutter aims to frame Bailey and have his business shut down.  Bailey, however, is wise to Rutter's plan and teams with best friends Eugene Groebe (Leif Green) and McDorfus (Jim Greenleaf) to stop this scheme, which also involves a video game duel with punker King Vidiot (Jon Gries).

Cast
 Joe Don Baker as Joseph Rutter
 Leif Green as Eugene Groebe
 Jim Greenleaf as Jonathan Andrew McDorfus
 Scott McGinnis as Jefferson Bailey
 Jon Gries as King Vidiot (credited as Jonathan Gries)
 Corinne Bohrer as Patsy Rutter
 John Diehl as Arnie
 John Voldstad as Max
 Reid Cruickshanks as Coach Straight
 Morgan Lofting as Mrs. Rutter
 Kym Malin as Lola
 Kim G. Michel as Alva
 Jacqulin Cole as Alexis Wheeler
 Logan Ramsey as Mayor Neville
 Justine Lenore as Nurse Tubitt

Production
Director Graydon Clark decided his next film would be an R-rated teen sex comedy based around video games when he saw a group of teenagers playing arcade games in the lobby during a test screening of his previous film, Wacko (film). The original title was Video Madness. The production took 13 days. Midway Games allowed the film to use the image of Pac-Man just for featuring its games in the film. These included Satan's Hollow and the then-unreleased Super Pac-Man used during the film's climactic video game showdown. It also showcased a game by Los Angeles company Computer Kinetics Corp. called Stripper, which was a mod of a Shoei game called Streaker.

Release
The film was theatrically released on March 4, 1983 in the United States by Jensen Farley Pictures and was the fifth highest grossing in its first week. It grossed $3,952,448 in the United States.

The film was released on VHS and Betamax by Vestron Video.  Liberation Entertainment released the film on DVD in 2006. It was released on Blu-ray by Scorpion in 2013 as a 30th anniversary edition.

Soundtrack
The film's soundtrack was released in November 2015 by Eczema Records.

References

External links
 
 

1980s sex comedy films
1983 films
1980s English-language films
Films about video games
American independent films
Films set in California
Films directed by Greydon Clark
American sex comedy films
Teen sex comedy films
1983 comedy films
Films about pranks
1980s American films